The Very Best of the Eagles is the fifth compilation album by the Eagles. It was originally released in Europe, Australia and New Zealand on July 11, 1994 by Elektra Records.

Europe and New Zealand received a standard release whereas in Australia it was also available as a numbered, limited edition Australian tour version that was pressed on a Gold CD.

The album was remastered and reissued in May 2001 with all the same songs that were on the original release but in a different sequence.

The compilation album was not released in the United States, although it was successful in other parts of the world, appearing in the top 10 of the albums charts in nine countries and becoming certified gold in seven countries and platinum in three.

Compilation and artwork
The Very Best of the Eagles is composed of seventeen songs, fifteen of which were released as singles and two songs—"Desperado" and "Doolin-Dalton"—that were album tracks from Desperado. The 2001 reissue's track listing is more loosely compiled.

Both issues of the album feature desert-themed photography. The first release featured art direction and design by Gabrielle Raumberger. The reissue had its art direction handled by Jeri Heiden with design by Barrie Goshko, who also did photo manipulation for the release.

Both the original and the reissue erroneously credit Glyn Johns as producer on the track “James Dean” from the “On The Border” album. It was produced by Bill Szymczyk.

Track listing

Original release

2001 reissue

Personnel
Glenn Frey – guitars, keyboards, vocals
Don Henley – drums, percussion, guitars, vocals
Bernie Leadon – guitars, banjo, vocals
Randy Meisner – bass, vocals
Don Felder – guitars, vocals
Joe Walsh – guitars, keyboards, vocals
Timothy B. Schmit – bass, vocals

Production

Glyn Johns – producer, engineer
Jim Ed Norman – string arrangements, piano
Bill Szymczyk – producer, engineer

Charts

Album charts

Certifications and sales

References 

1994 greatest hits albums
2001 greatest hits albums
Eagles (band) compilation albums
Elektra Records compilation albums
Asylum Records compilation albums
Albums produced by Glyn Johns
Albums produced by Bill Szymczyk